Ivar Østberg (born 15 November 1942 in Fredrikstad) is a Norwegian politician for the Christian Democratic Party.

He was elected to the Norwegian Parliament from Troms in 1997, and was re-elected in 2001.

Østberg was a member of Harstad city council during the term 1979 to 1983 and 1983–1987, serving as deputy mayor from 1983 to 1985.

References

1942 births
Living people
Christian Democratic Party (Norway) politicians
Members of the Storting
21st-century Norwegian politicians
20th-century Norwegian politicians